Crystal Lake is a  water body located in Belknap County in the Lakes Region of central New Hampshire, United States, in the town of Gilmanton. Crystal Lake is at the head of the Suncook River watershed. Water flows into Crystal Lake from the Belknap Range through Manning and Sunset lakes to the north. Water from Manning Lake enters Crystal Lake via Nelson Brook. Other waterways flowing into Crystal Lake include Wasson Brook and Mill Brook. Water flows out of a dam from the southern end of Crystal Lake via the Suncook Lakes and Suncook River to the Merrimack River. Shoreline development along Crystal Lake consists primarily of summer cottages, with a few year-round residents. Belknap Mountain and Mount Major can be seen from the shoreline.

Weather and climate 

Surface water temperatures range from a high near  in late July and early August to a hard freeze by year end.

Activities
There is a public boat launch, park and beach towards the southern end of the lake. Yearly festivals and fireworks occur during the Fourth of July and Labor Day holidays in the park on the lake. Other annual events include a boat parade, a sailboat race, and illuma-night. Motorized water vessels are permitted. Fishing is common year round. Water skiing, kayaking, sailing and Jet Skiing are common in the summer. Ice fishing is common during the winter.

The lake is classified as a warm- and coldwater fishery, with observed species including rainbow trout, rainbow smelt, smallmouth bass, largemouth bass, chain pickerel, brown bullhead, yellow perch, and sunfish.

History 
Native Indians referred to Crystal Lake as "Suncook" in reference not only to the lake, but also to the Suncook River that originates there. Early settlers referred to Crystal Lake as Lougee's Pond, in reference to the Lougee family that resided on the western side of the lake.

Iron content in and around Crystal Lake was enough to attract interest in iron mining; references to mining date back to 1778. The settlement that grew up at the outlet of Crystal Lake is accordingly called Gilmanton Ironworks.

In the early 1900s a resort known as "The Pines" was established on the southern peninsula of Crystal Lake. The resort subsequently burned down and was abandoned.

Wildlife 
Crystal Lake is a nesting site for common loons and is a good place to see them in breeding plumage during the summer months.  Bald eagles and great blue herons are also known to visit the lake. Moose, black bear, otters, and beavers have been sighted near the shoreline.

Photo gallery

See also

List of lakes in New Hampshire

References

External links
 Topo map, NH Department of Environmental Services
 Crystal and Manning Lakes photos and information

Lakes of Belknap County, New Hampshire
Gilmanton, New Hampshire